Aleksandr Lvovich Shulenin (born 31 October 1979) is a Russian professional football coach and a former player. He is the physical training coach of FC Torpedo Moscow.

Club career
He made his professional debut in the Russian Second Division in 1998 for FC Khimki.

References

1979 births
Living people
Russian footballers
Association football midfielders
FC Khimki players
FC Shinnik Yaroslavl players
FC Sibir Novosibirsk players
Russian Premier League players
FC Volga Nizhny Novgorod players
FC Sodovik Sterlitamak players
FC Baltika Kaliningrad players
People from Khimki
Sportspeople from Moscow Oblast